Eileen Wilson Powell (April 19, 1894 – September 12, 1942), born Julia Mary Tierney, was an American actress.

Early life 
Julia Mary Tierney was born in New York City, the daughter of Thomas P. Tierney and Mary L. Hyde Tierney.

Career 
Wilson appeared in Broadway and touring shows, including Within the Law (1913), A King of Nowhere (1916), The Love Drive (1917), In for the Night (1917), No More Blondes (1920), The Lady of the Lamp (1920), East is West (1922), Partners Again (1922), The Night Duel (1926), The Little Spitfire (1926-1927), Burlesque (1927–1928), and Peter Flies High (1931).

Personal life 
Wilson married actor William M. Powell in 1915. They had a son, William David Powell, who became a television writer and producer. The Powells separated soon after their son's birth in 1925, and finally divorced in 1930. She died in 1942, aged 48 years, in New York City.

References

External links 

 

1894 births
1942 deaths
American actresses